J'den Michael Tbory Cox (/ˈdʒeɪdən/ JAY-dən, born March 3, 1995) is an American freestyle wrestler and graduated folkstyle wrestler who competes at 92 kilograms. In freestyle, Cox is a two-time World Champion (bronze medalist in 2021) at 92 kilos, and while competing at 86 kilos, he claimed a bronze medal from the 2016 Summer Olympics and a 2017 World Championship bronze medal. During college, Cox wrestled for the Missouri Tigers, and was a three-time NCAA Division I national champion and four-time Mid-American Conference champion, becoming one of the most accomplished Tigers in the program's history.

Early life

Cox was born and raised in Columbia, Missouri and began wrestling at the age of four. The first youth state tournament Cox entered is the last state tournament at any level he did not win. Cox began training with Mike Eierman (Jaydin Eierman's father) in 2006 and continued training with Eierman until his move to the United States Olympic Training Center in Colorado Springs, Colorado in 2018.

Cox attended Hickman High School, where he was an all–state linebacker in addition to a standout high school wrestler.  He was a four–time Missouri state champion, and one of the first wrestlers in Missouri to win titles at four different weight classes.  Cox compiled a 205–3 record in his high school career, suffering all three losses his freshman season.

Cox also had success on the national level. In 2011 he won a Cadet National Championship in Greco-Roman, and took third place in freestyle. A rivalry developed between Cox and fellow future multiple-time World Champion Kyle Snyder.  Cox defeated Snyder in the Greco-Roman final while losing to Snyder in pool competition in freestyle. In 2012, Cox won a Junior National Championship in freestyle and took third in Greco-Roman. Again Cox and Snyder traded victories between styles, with Cox defeating Snyder in pool competition in freestyle and Snyder defeating Cox in Greco-Roman pool competition.

Cox was ranked the third-overall recruit in the 2013 class by FloWrestling and sixth overall by InterMat.

College career

Cox stayed at home in Columbia and wrestled collegiately for the Missouri Tigers.  Cox bypassed a redshirt year and wrestled right away for the Tigers at 197 lbs. in the 2013–14 season. He was a MAC champion and entered the 2014 NCAA Championships as the #2 seed.  Cox defeated Nick Heflin of Ohio State in final to become a national champion.  At the time Cox became just the 14th true freshman national champion in NCAA Division 1 history.  Cox finished the season with a 38–2 record and was recognized as both the 2014 MAC Wrestler of the Year and Freshman of the Year.

In his sophomore season, Cox again took home All-American honors by virtue of his 5th-place finish at the 2015 NCAA Championships.  Cox entered the tournament undefeated on the season and earned the #1 seed in the 197 lb. bracket.  Cox suffered his first loss of the year in the semifinal to Kyle Snyder and suffered another loss to Morgan McIntosh in consolations before finishing 5th.  He was a MAC champion again and finished the year with a 37–2 record.

Cox returned to the top of the podium in 2016.  After becoming a MAC champion for the third time, he entered the NCAA Championships as the #2 seed.  Cox defeated Morgan McIntosh in the final 4–2, avenging his loss from the previous year.  He joined Ben Askren as the only other two-time national champion in school history. Cox finished the season with a 33–1 record and was recognized as the MAC Wrestler of the Year for the second time.

In 2017, Cox finished off his collegiate career with another national championship.  He was a perfect 28–0 on the season and finished second in Hodge Trophy voting.  Cox was a MAC champion for the fourth time and was honored as the MAC Wrestler of the Year for the third time.

Cox was the first three-time national champion in program history.  Among program records, he finished his career ranked first in winning percentage (.965, 136–5) and tied for second in wins (136).

Freestyle career

2014–2015 
Cox was an accomplished freestyle wrestler growing up, claiming multiple US National Championships, despite never competing overseas. In 2014, the newly crowned freshman NCAA champion at 197 pounds, decided to compete at 97 kilograms (214 pounds) despite being undersized for the weight class, and made his senior level debut by placing third at the US University National Championships, and later in the month competing at the US World Team Trials, but failing to place. In 2015, he placed fourth at the US Senior Nationals, falling to eventual 2015 World Champion Kyle Snyder by one point throughout the bracket.

2016 
As a 2016 NCAA champion, Cox qualified to compete at the 2016 US Olympic Team Trials, and chose to trim down to 86 kilograms. Despite being the ninth seed, Cox was able to upset multiple high–level opponents to make the best–of–three, beating '11 NCAA runner–up from Oklahoma State Clayton Foster, '09 World Championship runner–up Jake Herbert and two–time US Open and NCAA champion Keith Gavin to reach the finale. There, he defeated four–time NCAA champion Kyle Dake, who was bumping up from 74 kilograms, two matches to one to claim the 2016 US Olympic Team spot.

However, the weight had not been qualified for the Summer Olympics for the United States, which meant Cox would have overcome a field at one of the qualification tournaments to qualify. Cox did just that when he comfortably won gold at the 2016 World Olympic Qualification Tournament I, his first tournament overseas. After defeating '12 University World Champion from Iran Meisam Mostafa-Jokar at Beat the Streets, Cox competed for Team USA at the 2016 World Cup, beating two–time Commonwealth champion Pawan Kumar, returning World Championship bronze medalist from Iran Alireza Karimi and 2016 European Championship runner–up Aleksander Gostiev, before being defeated himself by '12 Olympic bronze medalist from Georgia Dato Marsagishvili, helping Team USA reach fourth place. To warm up for the Summer Olympics, Cox placed third at the Grand Prix of Germany, suffering his lone loss to World and reigning Olympic champion from Azerbaijan Sharif Sharifov.

At the Summer Olympics, Cox claimed victories over Amarhajy Mahamedau and Alireza Karimi before suffering a loss to '09 Junior World Champion Selim Yaşar in the semifinals, getting knocked off to the consolation bracket, where he posted a victory over reigning Pan American Games champion Reineris Salas, in a match were the Cuban refused to continue after suffering a takedown from Cox. This result drove Cox to becoming a bronze medalist at the 2016 Summer Olympics.

2017 
After collegiate graduation, the three–time NCAA champion went on to defend his US World Team spot against reigning US National champion and eventual '18 World Champion David Taylor at the 2017 US World Team Trials in June. After losing the first match, Cox rallied to defeat Taylor twice in a row despite a knee injury to retain the spot, although controversially due to his excessive sweat and alleged passivity. At the 2017 World Championships, he most notably went on to defeat '12 Junior World Championship runner–up Ahmed Dudarov and Dan Kolov International champion Zbigniew Baranowski before losing to Boris Makojev, coming back and defeating 2010 World Champion Mihail Ganev for bronze.

2018–2019 
Cox made his return by moving up to 92 kilograms in February 2018, claiming a silver medal from the Ukrainian Open after losing to World and Olympic champion Sharif Sharifov in the finale. He then went 1–2 at the World Cup, helping Team USA reach the team championship for the first time in 15 years. Cox then went on to claim the US National Championship and retain the US World Team spot at Final X. Before the World Championships, Cox went 0–1 at the Yasar Dogu.

Despite his low international success at the new weight class earlier in the year, Cox went on to claim his first World Championship for the United States, defeating two–time European Continental champion from Georgia Dato Marsagishvili, three–time Olympian from  Moldova Nicolai Ceban, '18 Asian Games gold medalist from Iran Alireza Karimi and '16 European Championship runner–up from Belarus Ivan Yankouski.

The returning World Champion, Cox claimed his first Pan American Continental Championship in his first tournament of the year, helping the US reach gold in all of the 10 freestyle categories in the competition. Cox then went on to defend his US World Team spot once again, headlining Final X Rutgers, where he shut down reigning US National champion, recently graduated three–time NCAA champion and Dan Hodge Trophy winner Bo Nickal twice in a row. He then swept past the prestigious Yasar Dogu field with all technical falls to claim the championship.

At the World Championships, the defending champion was able to retain his spot on top of the podium and claim his second World Championship, most notably defeating Irakli Mtsituri and Alireza Karimi.

2020–2021 
To start off the 2020 Summer Olympic year, Cox moved up to 97 kilograms to fit the weight class requirements for the Olympics. In his first tournament, he most notably downed '15 Pan American Games champion (86kg) Reineris Salas and returning Junior World Championship runner–up Yonger Bastida to claim gold at the Cerro Pelado International. Cox was then scheduled to compete at the US Olympic Team Trials, however, the COVID-19 outbreak postponed both the US Team Trials and the Summer Olympics for a year later.

Cox did not come back to action until a year later when he competed at a series of FloWrestling events, compiling six more wins in total during January and February 2021. Cox was then expected to compete at the rescheduled US Olympic Team Trials, as the favorite to challenge reigning Olympic champion Kyle Snyder in the best–of–three. However, it was announced on the day of the event that Cox had missed weight, therefore he had been removed from competition. Days later, more detail was given to the public, and it was explained that Cox had arrived to the weight-ins on time, but once he had stepped on the scale and successfully made the weight limit of 97 kg, it had been thirteen minutes past the 8:00 AM deadline, therefore, it was ruled as invalid by USA Wrestling. Cox explained that he was misinformed of the weight-ins schedule by his coach Kevin Jackson, who is part of USA Wrestling.

Cox protested the decision and him and his coach Kevin Jackson decided to appeal, however, nothing came to fruition. A month later, Cox dropped the appeal and announced he had moved past the incident, stating;
After the incidents, Cox moved back down to 92 kilograms and competed at the Poland Open on June 9. In an upset, Cox was defeated in the semifinals by a regional circuit wrestler from Ukraine, and forfeited his next bout.

Cox came back and competed at the 2021 US World Team Trials as the top-seed on September 11–12, intending to represent the country at the World Championships for the third straight time. He was once again able to show off his signature movements and went unscored throughout his championship run, downing NCAA champions Drew Foster and Myles Martin, as well as powerhouse Kollin Moore.

At the 2021 World Championships, Cox ran through his first three opponents on the first date, before being downed in a frenetic match by two-time U23 World Champion Kamran Ghasempour in the semifinals. The former champion defeated Ukraine in the bronze medal match to claim third place instead.

2022 
In late 2021, it was announced that the brand RUDIS would organize an event headlined by a super match between Olympic, World and NCAA champion Kyle Snyder and Cox, which took place on March 16, 2022, in a best of three format. Cox was defeated in two straight bouts via decision.

Personal life

J'den is the son of Michael and Cathy Cox, both musicians. Cathy has long been associated with Mizzou athletics herself: she regularly performs the national anthem at Tiger basketball games. He has two older brothers Zach and Drae, and a younger sister Chai.  Cox's uncle Phil Arnold was a two-time Missouri state champion for Hickman High School. The headgear Arnold used in winning his two titles is the same Cox and his older brothers wore during their high school careers.

Cox has lost most of the hearing in his left ear and some of the hearing in his right.  Even before he started losing his hearing in college, he was interested in sign language.  He took classes on sign language in both high school and college and one day would like to teach those who are hearing impaired.  Cox posts videos teaching basic elements of sign language on social media, and Nike apparel supporting him includes the spelling of “Cox” in sign language.

Freestyle record

! colspan="7"| Senior Freestyle Matches
|-
!  Res.
!  Record
!  Opponent
!  Score
!  Date
!  Event
!  Location
|-
! style=background:white colspan=7 |
|-
|Win
|88–19
|align=left| Nate Jackson
|style="font-size:88%"|3–0
|style="font-size:88%" rowspan=3|June 3, 2022
|style="font-size:88%" rowspan=3|2022 Final X: Stillwater
|style="text-align:left;font-size:88%;" rowspan=3|
 Stillwater, Oklahoma
|-
|Loss
|87–19
|align=left| Nate Jackson
|style="font-size:88%"|2–3
|-
|Win
|87–18
|align=left| Nate Jackson
|style="font-size:88%"|4–2
|-
! style=background:white colspan=7 |
|-
|Win
|86–18
|align=left| Cristian Sánchez Hernández
|style="font-size:88%"|TF 10–0
|style="font-size:88%" rowspan=3|May 8, 2022
|style="font-size:88%" rowspan=3|2022 Pan American Continental Championships
|style="text-align:left;font-size:88%;" rowspan=3| Acapulco, Mexico
|-
|Win
|85–18
|align=left| Gilberto Ayala Rodriguez
|style="font-size:88%"|TF 11–0
|-
|Win
|84–18
|align=left| Jeremy Poirier
|style="font-size:88%"|TF 11–0
|-
! style=background:white colspan=7 | 
|-
|Loss
|83–18
|align=left| Kyle Snyder
|style="font-size:88%"|2–7
|style="font-size:88%" rowspan=2|March 16, 2022
|style="font-size:88%" rowspan=2|RUDIS+ Super Match: Snyder vs. Cox
|style="text-align:left;font-size:88%;" rowspan=2|
 Detroit, Michigan
|-
|Loss
|83–17
|align=left| Kyle Snyder
|style="font-size:88%"|5–5
|-
! style=background:white colspan=7 |
|-
|Win
|83–16
|align=left| Andriy Vlasov
|style="font-size:88%"|TF 11–0
|style="font-size:88%"|October 4, 2021
|style="font-size:88%" rowspan=5|2021 World Championships
|style="text-align:left;font-size:88%;" rowspan=5| Oslo, Norway
|-
|Loss
|82–16
|align=left| Kamran Ghasempour
|style="font-size:88%"|3–3
|style="font-size:88%" rowspan=4|October 3, 2021
|-
|Win
|82–15
|align=left| Jérémy Poirier
|style="font-size:88%"|TF 10–0
|-
|Win
|81–15
|align=left| Simone Iannattoni
|style="font-size:88%"|TF 10–0
|-
|Win
|80–15
|align=left| Dagvadorjiin Orgilokh
|style="font-size:88%"|TF 13–2
|-
! style=background:white colspan=7 |
|-
|Win
|79–15
|align=left| Kollin Moore
|style="font-size:88%"|4–0
|style="font-size:88%" rowspan=2|September 12, 2021
|style="font-size:88%" rowspan=4|2021 US World Team Trials
|style="text-align:left;font-size:88%;" rowspan=4| Lincoln, Nebraska
|-
|Win
|78–15
|align=left| Kollin Moore
|style="font-size:88%"|5–0
|-
|Win
|77–15
|align=left| Myles Martin
|style="font-size:88%"|8–0
|style="font-size:88%" rowspan=2|September 11, 2021
|-
|Win
|76–15
|align=left| Drew Foster
|style="font-size:88%"|TF 11–0
|-
! style=background:white colspan=7 |
|-
|Loss
|75–15
|align=left| Illia Archaia
|style="font-size:88%"|1–2
|style="font-size:88%" rowspan=2|June 9, 2021
|style="font-size:88%" rowspan=2|2021 Poland Open
|style="text-align:left;font-size:88%;" rowspan=2|
 Warsaw, Poland
|-
|Win
|75–14
|align=left| Ilja Matuhin
|style="font-size:88%"|4–2
|-
! style=background:white colspan=7 | 
|-
|Win
|74–14
|align=left| Scottie Boykin
|style="font-size:88%"|TF 11–0
|style="font-size:88%" rowspan=4|February 10–11, 2021
|style="font-size:88%" rowspan=4|2021 America's Cup
|style="text-align:left;font-size:88%;" rowspan=4|
 Concord, North Carolina
|-
|Win
|73–14
|align=left| Benjamin Honis
|style="font-size:88%"|TF 12–0
|-
|Win
|72–14
|align=left| Hayden Zillmer
|style="font-size:88%"|5–0
|-
|Win
|71–14
|align=left| Benjamin Honis
|style="font-size:88%"|TF 10–0
|-
|Win
|70-14
|align=left| Nate Jackson
|style="font-size:88%"|6-1
|style="font-size:88%"|January 13, 2021
|style="font-size:88%"|FloWrestling: Burroughs vs. Taylor
|style="text-align:left;font-size:88%;" |
 Lincoln, Nebraska
|-
|Win
|69-14
|align=left| Hayden Zillmer
|style="font-size:88%"|6-2
|style="font-size:88%"|January 9, 2021
|style="font-size:88%"|FloWrestling: Mensah-Stock vs. Gray
|style="text-align:left;font-size:88%;"|
 Austin, Texas
|-
! style=background:white colspan=7 |
|-
|Win
|68-14
|align=left| Yonger Bastida
|style="font-size:88%"|TF 11-1
|style="font-size:88%" rowspan=3|February 9–17, 2020
|style="font-size:88%" rowspan=3|2020 Granma y Cerro Pelado
|style="text-align:left;font-size:88%;" rowspan=3| Habana, Cuba
|-
|Win
|67-14
|align=left| Jacob Kasper
|style="font-size:88%"|4-0
|-
|Win
|66-14
|align=left| Reineris Salas
|style="font-size:88%"|5-3
|-
! style=background:white colspan=7 |
|-
|Win
|65-14
|align=left| Alireza Karimi 
|style="font-size:88%"|4-0
|style="font-size:88%" rowspan=4|September 20–21, 2019
|style="font-size:88%" rowspan=4|2019 World Wrestling Championships
|style="text-align:left;font-size:88%;" rowspan=4| Nur-Sultan, Kazakhstan
|-
|Win
|64-14
|align=left| Irakli Mtsituri
|style="font-size:88%"|3-0
|-
|Win
|63-14
|align=left| Nurgali Nurgaipuly
|style="font-size:88%"|8-0
|-
|Win
|62-14
|align=left| Mohammed Fardj
|style="font-size:88%"|TF 11-0
|-
! style=background:white colspan=7 |
|-
|Win
|61-14
|align=left| Bendegúz Tóth
|style="font-size:88%"|TF 10-0
|style="font-size:88%" rowspan=4|July 11–14, 2019
|style="font-size:88%" rowspan=4|2019 Yaşar Doğu
|style="text-align:left;font-size:88%;" rowspan=4| Istanbul, Turkey
|-
|Win
|60-14
|align=left| Shamil Zubairov
|style="font-size:88%"|TF 11-0
|-
|Win
|59-14
|align=left| Mohammed Fardj
|style="font-size:88%"|TF 11-0
|-
|Win
|58-14
|align=left| Abubakar Turgayev
|style="font-size:88%"|TF 11-0
|-
! style=background:white colspan=7 |
|-
|Win
|57-14
|align=left| Bo Nickal
|style="font-size:88%"|5-0
|style="font-size:88%" rowspan=2|June 8, 2019
|style="font-size:88%" rowspan=2|2019 Final X: Rutgers
|style="text-align:left;font-size:88%;" rowspan=2|
 New Brunswick, New Jersey
|-
|Win
|56-14
|align=left| Bo Nickal
|style="font-size:88%"|4-2
|-
|Win
|55-14
|align=left| Pat Brucki
|style="font-size:88%"|TF 13-0
|style="font-size:88%"|May 6, 2019
|style="font-size:88%"|2019 Beat The Streets: Grapple at the Garden
|style="text-align:left;font-size:88%;" |
 New York City, New York
|-
! style=background:white colspan=7 | 
|-
|Win
|54-14
|align=left| Diego Ramírez
|style="font-size:88%"|Fall
|style="font-size:88%" rowspan=2|April 19–21, 2019
|style="font-size:88%" rowspan=2|2019 Pan American Wrestling Championships
|style="text-align:left;font-size:88%;" rowspan=2|
 Buenos Aires, Argentina
|-
|Win
|53-14
|align=left| Jaime Espinal
|style="font-size:88%"|8-0
|-
! style=background:white colspan=7 |
|-
|Win
|52-14
|align=left| Ivan Yankouski
|style="font-size:88%"|4-1
|style="font-size:88%" rowspan=4|October 21–22, 2018
|style="font-size:88%" rowspan=4|2018 World Wrestling Championships
|style="text-align:left;font-size:88%;" rowspan=4| Budapest, Hungary
|-
|Win
|51-14
|align=left| Alireza Karimi
|style="font-size:88%"|5-2
|-
|Win
|50-14
|align=left| Nicolai Ceban
|style="font-size:88%"|6-0
|-
|Win
|49-14
|align=left| Dato Marsagishvili
|style="font-size:88%"|6-2
|-
! style=background:white colspan=7 |
|-
|Loss
|48-14
|align=left| Serdar Böke
|style="font-size:88%"|2-2
|style="font-size:88%"|July 27–29, 2018
|style="font-size:88%"|2018 Yaşar Doğu
|style="text-align:left;font-size:88%;" |
 Istanbul, Turkey
|-
! style=background:white colspan=7 |
|-
|Win
|48-13
|align=left| Hayden Zillmer
|style="font-size:88%"|TF 10-0
|style="font-size:88%" rowspan=2|June 22–23, 2018
|style="font-size:88%" rowspan=2|2018 US World Team Trials
|style="text-align:left;font-size:88%;" rowspan=2| Lincoln, Nebraska
|-
|Win
|47-13
|align=left| Hayden Zillmer
|style="font-size:88%"|5–2
|-
|Win
|46-13
|align=left| Yurieski Torreblanca
|style="font-size:88%"|2-1
|style="font-size:88%"|May 17, 2018
|style="font-size:88%"|2018 Beat The Streets: Team USA vs. Team Cuba
|style="text-align:left;font-size:88%;" |
 New York City, New York
|-
! style=background:white colspan=7 |
|-
|Win
|45-13
|align=left| Hayden Zillmer
|style="font-size:88%"|2-0
|style="font-size:88%" rowspan=4|April 24–28, 2018
|style="font-size:88%" rowspan=4|2018 US Open National Wrestling Championships
|style="text-align:left;font-size:88%;" rowspan=4|
 Las Vegas, Nevada
|-
|Win
|44-13
|align=left| Deron Winn
|style="font-size:88%"|3-0
|-
|Win
|43-13
|align=left| Tanner Orndorff
|style="font-size:88%"|TF 10-0
|-
|Win
|42-13
|align=left| Jeremiah Imonode
|style="font-size:88%"|TF 10-0
|-
! style=background:white colspan=7 |
|-
|Loss
|41-13
|align=left| Aslanbek Alborov
|style="font-size:88%"|4-4
|style="font-size:88%" rowspan=3|April 7–8, 2018
|style="font-size:88%" rowspan=3|2018 Wrestling World Cup - Men's freestyle
|style="text-align:left;font-size:88%;" rowspan=3| Iowa City, Iowa
|-
|Loss
|41-12
|align=left| Dato Marsagishvili
|style="font-size:88%"|0-5
|-
|Win
|41-11
|align=left| Takashi Ishiguro
|style="font-size:88%"|TF 11-0
|-
! style=background:white colspan=7 |
|-
|Loss
|40-11
|align=left| Sharif Sharifov
|style="font-size:88%"|7-8
|style="font-size:88%" rowspan=4|February 23–25, 2018
|style="font-size:88%" rowspan=4|XXII Outstanding Ukrainian Wrestlers and Coaches Memorial
|style="text-align:left;font-size:88%;" rowspan=4|
 Kyiv, Ukraine
|-
|Win
|40-10
|align=left| Riley Lefever
|style="font-size:88%"|2-0
|-
|Win
|39-10
|align=left| Edgarus Voitechovskij
|style="font-size:88%"|7-1
|-
|Win
|38-10
|align=left| Shamir Atyan
|style="font-size:88%"|TF 11-0
|-
! style=background:white colspan=7 |
|-
|Win
|37-10
|align=left| Mihail Ganev
|style="font-size:88%"|8-0
|style="font-size:88%" rowspan=5|August 25, 2017
|style="font-size:88%" rowspan=5|2017 World Wrestling Championships
|style="text-align:left;font-size:88%;" rowspan=5| Paris, France
|-
|Loss
|36-10
|align=left| Boris Makojev
|style="font-size:88%"|3-6
|-
|Win
|36-9
|align=left| Zbigniew Baranowski
|style="font-size:88%"|3-2
|-
|Win
|35-9
|align=left| Ville Heino
|style="font-size:88%"|9-6
|-
|Win
|34-9
|align=left| Ahmed Dudarov
|style="font-size:88%"|6-1
|-
! style=background:white colspan=7 |
|-
|Win
|33-9
|align=left| David Taylor
|style="font-size:88%"|5-3
|style="font-size:88%" rowspan=3|June 10, 2017
|style="font-size:88%" rowspan=3|2017 US World Team Trials
|style="text-align:left;font-size:88%;" rowspan=3|
 Lincoln, Nebraska
|-
|Win
|32-9
|align=left| David Taylor
|style="font-size:88%"|4-3
|-
|Loss
|31-9
|align=left| David Taylor
|style="font-size:88%"|3-9
|-
! style=background:white colspan=7 |
|-
|Win
|31-8
|align=left| Reineris Salas
|style="font-size:88%"|FF (3-1)
|style="font-size:88%" rowspan=4|August 20, 2016
|style="font-size:88%" rowspan=4|2016 Summer Olympics
|style="text-align:left;font-size:88%;" rowspan=4| Rio de Janeiro, Brazil
|-
|Loss
|30-8
|align=left| Selim Yaşar
|style="font-size:88%"|1-2
|-
|Win
|30-7
|align=left| Alireza Karimi
|style="font-size:88%"|5-1
|-
|Win
|29-7
|align=left| Amarhajy Mahamedau
|style="font-size:88%"|7-1
|-
! style=background:white colspan=7 |
|-
|Win
|28-7
|align=left| Adilet Davlumbaev
|style="font-size:88%"|10-5
|style="font-size:88%" rowspan=4|July 2–3, 2016
|style="font-size:88%" rowspan=4|2016 Grand Prix of Germany
|style="text-align:left;font-size:88%;" rowspan=4| Dortmund, Germany
|-
|Win
|27-7
|align=left| Konstantin Voelk
|style="font-size:88%"|Fall
|-
|Loss
|26-7
|align=left| Sharif Sharifov
|style="font-size:88%"|2-6
|-
|Win
|26-6
|align=left| Kanat Berdiyev
|style="font-size:88%"|TF 10–0
|-
! style=background:white colspan=7 |
|-
|Loss
|25-6
|align=left| Dato Marsagishvili
|style="font-size:88%"|4-7
|style="font-size:88%" rowspan=4|June 11–12, 2016
|style="font-size:88%" rowspan=4|2016 Wrestling World Cup – Men's freestyle
|style="text-align:left;font-size:88%;" rowspan=4| Los Angeles, California
|-
|Win
|25-5
|align=left| Aleksander Gostiev
|style="font-size:88%"|3-2
|-
|Win
|24-5
|align=left| Alireza Karimi
|style="font-size:88%"|6-2
|-
|Win
|23-5
|align=left| Pawan Kumar
|style="font-size:88%"|TF 10-0
|-
|Win
|22-5
|align=left| Meisam Mostafa-Jokar
|style="font-size:88%"|10-5
|style="font-size:88%"|May 19, 2016
|style="font-size:88%"|2016 Beat The Streets: United In The Square
|style="text-align:left;font-size:88%;" |
 New York City, New York
|-
! style=background:white colspan=7 | 
|-
|Win
|21-5
|align=left| Pedro Ceballos
|style="font-size:88%"|6-0
|style="font-size:88%" rowspan=5|April 24, 2016
|style="font-size:88%" rowspan=5|2016 World Wrestling Olympic Qualification Tournament 1
|style="text-align:left;font-size:88%;" rowspan=5|
 Ulaanbaatar, Mongolia
|-
|Win
|20-5
|align=left| Umidjon Ismanov
|style="font-size:88%"|5-2
|-
|Win
|19-5
|align=left| Zbigniew Baranowski
|style="font-size:88%"|4-1
|-
|Win
|18-5
|align=left| Timofei Xenidis
|style="font-size:88%"|TF 10-0
|-
|Win
|17-5
|align=left| Shamir Atyan
|style="font-size:88%"|TF 11-0
|-
! style=background:white colspan=7 | 
|-
|Win
|16-5
|align=left| Kyle Dake
|style="font-size:88%"|5-3
|style="font-size:88%"rowspan=6|April 10, 2016
|style="font-size:88%"rowspan=3|2016 US Olympic Team Trials
|style="text-align:left;font-size:88%;" rowspan=6|
 Iowa City, Iowa
|-
|Loss
|15-5
|align=left| Kyle Dake
|style="font-size:88%"|3-5
|-
|Win
|15-4
|align=left| Kyle Dake
|style="font-size:88%"|8-1
|-
|Win
|14-4
|align=left| Keith Gavin
|style="font-size:88%"|3-1
|style="font-size:88%"rowspan=3|2016 US Olympic Team Trials Challenge
|-
|Win
|13-4
|align=left| Jake Herbert
|style="font-size:88%"|8-1
|-
|Win
|12-4
|align=left| Clayton Foster
|style="font-size:88%"|7-7
|-
! style=background:white colspan=7 |
|-
|Win
|11-4
|align=left |  Wynn Michalak
|style="font-size:88%"|4-1
|style="font-size:88%" rowspan=5|May 7–9, 2015
|style="font-size:88%" rowspan=5|2015 US Senior National Championships
|style="text-align:left;font-size:88%;" rowspan=5| Las Vegas, Nevada
|-
|Loss
|10-4
|align=left |  Kyle Snyder
|style="font-size:88%"|3-4
|-
|Win
|10-3
|align=left |  Cayle Byers
|style="font-size:88%"|4-0
|-
|Win
|9-3
|align=left |  David Zabriskie
|style="font-size:88%"|9-5
|-
|Win
|8-3
|align=left| Josh Manu
|style="font-size:88%"|11-4
|-
! style=background:white colspan=7 |
|-
|Loss
|7-3
|align=left |  J. D. Bergman
|style="font-size:88%"|2-4
|style="font-size:88%" rowspan=4|May 29, 2014
|style="font-size:88%" rowspan=4|2014 US World Team Trials Challenge
|style="text-align:left;font-size:88%;" rowspan=4| Madison, Wisconsin
|-
|Loss
|7-2
|align=left |  Deron Winn
|style="font-size:88%"|2-10
|-
|Win
|7-1
|align=left |  Wynn Michalak
|style="font-size:88%"|5-0
|-
|Win
|6-1
|align=left| Jack Jensen
|style="font-size:88%"|8-0
|-
! style=background:white colspan=7 |
|-
|Win
|5-1
|align=left |  Alex Polizzi
|style="font-size:88%"|TF 12-2
|style="font-size:88%" rowspan=6|May 22–25, 2014
|style="font-size:88%" rowspan=6|2014 US University National Championships
|style="text-align:left;font-size:88%;" rowspan=6| Akron, Ohio
|-
|Loss
|4-1
|align=left |  Lucas Sheridan
|style="font-size:88%"|Fall
|-
|Win
|4-0
|align=left |  Matt Meadows
|style="font-size:88%"|TF 11-0
|-
|Win
|3-0
|align=left |  Mike Fetchet
|style="font-size:88%"|TF 10-0
|-
|Win
|2-0
|align=left |  Brandon Litten
|style="font-size:88%"|TF 10-0
|-
|Win
|1-0
|align=left| Alec Brown
|style="font-size:88%"|TF 11-0
|-

References

External links 
 
 
 
 

1995 births
Living people
Sportspeople from Columbia, Missouri
American male sport wrestlers
Olympic bronze medalists for the United States in wrestling
Wrestlers at the 2016 Summer Olympics
Olympic medalists in wrestling
Medalists at the 2016 Summer Olympics
World Wrestling Championships medalists
Hickman High School alumni
University of Missouri alumni
African-American sport wrestlers